The 12331 / 12332 Himgiri Superfast Express is a Superfast train of the Indian Railways connecting  in West Bengal and  in Jammu and Kashmir. It is currently being operated with 12331/12332 train numbers on three days in week. It covers a total distance of  that runs through the major north states of India. The old ICF coach of the trains were replaced with the new LHB coach during Mid 14 August 2018.

History

In 1975 in order to bring equality amongst all classes and provide good train experience to all strata of society, the Himgiri Express was launched. The Himgiri Express made its inaugural run on 1 January 1979. From 1979 to 2004, Himgiri Express followed a fast time table. However, 19 more stoppages were added between 2004 and 2020 period. This hampered operation & punctuality failed miserably. It was also when this express was launched that the Indian Railways abolished the third class in trains.

Services 
 
Currently the train takes 36 hrs 45 mins to cover the journey. Departing at 23.55 hrs from Howrah Junction & arriving Jammu Tawi at 12.40 hrs on 3rd day as 12331 Himgiri Express. On return, departing 22.45 hrs from Jammu Tawi & arriving Howrah Junction at 11.30 hrs on 3rd day as 12332 Himgiri Express. Train had been slowed by 4 hrs 45 mins from 2004 onwards after 19 more halts were added.

Route & halts
The important halts of the train are;

Traction 
Both trains are hauled by a Howrah-based WAP-5 / WAP-7 (HOG)-equipped locomotive from end to end

Coach composition

The train consists of 22 coaches:
 1 composite (first class AC+2tier AC)
 1 AC 2 Tier
 4 AC three tier
 1 buffet car
10 sleeper coach
3 unreserved coach 
2 EOG

See also 
 Archana Express
 Begampura Express
 Kolkata–Jammu Tawi Express

References 

12331/Himgiri SF Express India Rail Info
12332/Himgiri SF Express India Rail Info

Rail transport in Jammu and Kashmir
Rail transport in Punjab, India
Rail transport in Uttar Pradesh
Rail transport in Bihar
Rail transport in West Bengal
Transport in Jammu
Rail transport in Howrah
Express trains in India
Railway services introduced in 1979
1979 establishments in India
Named passenger trains of India